Eladio Herrera may refer to:

 Eladio Herrera (boxer) (born 1930), former Argentine boxer
 Eladio Herrera (footballer) (born 1984), Chilean footballer